San Juan River is a river in Brunswick Peninsula in Chile's Magallanes Region. The river is the main water supply for the city of Punta Arenas. It drains to the Strait of Magellan.

References

Brunswick Peninsula
Rivers of Chile
Rivers of Magallanes Region